The Flatiron Building, also known as Ringlers Annex and Espresso Bar is a historic two-story building in downtown Portland, Oregon. Since 1989, it has been listed on the National Register of Historic Places. Previously, it had been designated a Portland Landmark by the city's Historic Landmarks Commission in 1988.  This small building has a triangular footprint, as it sits at the end of a triangular lot bounded by West Burnside, SW Stark, and 12th Streets.

From its inception, the building's size has played part in how it has been promoted. When opened, it was said to be the "smallest commercial building on the West Coast". Over its lifespan, the building hosted a catering kitchen and a talk radio station. The current occupant, a McMenamins pub calls it "a tiny window on the world of bustling West Burnside, complete with a fishbowl-like main floor and a mezzanine tailor-made to observe the city in motion".

See also
List of buildings named Flatiron Building
National Register of Historic Places listings in Southwest Portland, Oregon

References

External links
 McMenamins: Ringlers Annex (Official site)
 Barfly Magazine page with viewer comments about Ringlers Annex

1916 establishments in Oregon
Buildings and structures in Portland, Oregon
Chicago school architecture in Oregon
Commercial buildings completed in 1916
Frederick Manson White buildings
National Register of Historic Places in Portland, Oregon
Portland Historic Landmarks
Southwest Portland, Oregon
Flatiron buildings